The list of ship commissionings in 1907 includes a chronological list of all ships commissioned in 1907.



1907